Jaunanna Parish is an administrative unit of Alūksne Municipality, Latvia.

Towns, villages and settlements of Jaunanna Parish 

Parishes of Latvia
Alūksne Municipality